Amphitheater  Lake is located in Grand Teton National Park, in the U. S. state of Wyoming. Disappointment Peak is  WNW of the lake.

References

Lakes of Grand Teton National Park